The Tongva language (also known as Gabrielino or Gabrieleño) is an extinct Uto-Aztecan language formerly spoken by the Tongva, a Native American people who live in and around Los Angeles, California. It has not been a language of everyday conversation since the 1940s. The Gabrielino people now speak English but a few are attempting to revive their language by using it in everyday conversation and ceremonial contexts. Presently, Gabrielino is also being used in language revitalization classes and in some public discussion regarding religious and environmental issues. Tongva is closely related to Serrano. The names of several cities and neighborhoods in Southern California are of Tongva origin, and include Pacoima, Tujunga, Topanga, Azusa, Cahuenga in Cahuenga Pass and Cucamonga in Rancho Cucamonga.

The last fluent native speakers of Tongva lived in the early 20th century. The language is primarily documented in the unpublished field notes of John Peabody Harrington made during that time. The "J.P. Harrington Project", developed by The Smithsonian through University of California, Davis, approximately 6,000 pages of his notes on the Tongva language, were coded for documentation by a Tongva member, who took three years to accomplish the task. Alleged native speakers of Tongva who have died as late as in the 1970s have not been verified as having been fluent speakers.

The minor planet 50000 Quaoar was named after the Tongva creator god.

Language revitalization 

The Gabrielino language is a subgroup of Takic, a subfamily of Uto-Aztecan, which is usually divided into three subgoups: Serrano-Kitanemuk, Gabrielino (including the Fernandeno dialect) and Cupan. As of 2012, members of the contemporary Tongva (Gabrieleño) tribal council are attempting to revive the language, by making use of written vocabularies, by comparison to better attested members of the Takic group to which Tongva belonged, and by offering classes. 

In 2004, Pamela Munro, now UCLA emeritus professor of linguistics, was asked to serve as a linguistic mentor to Tongva people who wanted to learn about their language at the Breath of Life Workshop, a biennial event in Berkeley staged by the Advocates for Indigenous California Language Survival. Since then, she has taught monthly Tongva language classes in which adults and children practice pronunciation, master the use of grammatical particles, sing songs and play word games. She calls her work "a reclamation effort" for the language. Munro has compiled a Tongva dictionary of over 1,000 words, and also maintains a Tongva language Facebook page to which she posts Tongva words, phrases and songs. Munro says there are no audio recordings of people speaking the Tongva language, but that there are a few scratched wax cylinder recordings of Tongva songs.

Phonology

Consonants
The following is a list of the consonants and vowels of the Tongva language as used by the Tongva Language Committee, based on linguist Pamela Munro's interpretation of the fieldnotes of J. P. Harrington. In parentheses is the spelling of the specific sound. Note that there are multiple orthographies for the Tongva language.

Consonants  are used in loanwords.

Vowels

Morphology
Tongva is an agglutinative language, where words use suffixes and multiple morphemes for a variety of purposes.

Vocabulary

The Lord's Prayer
The Lord's Prayer is called ʼEyoonak in Tongva. The following text was derived from old Mission records.

Collected by C. Hart Merriam (1903)

(Merriam refers to them as the Tongvā)

Numbers
 Po-koo
 Wěh-hā
 Pah-hā
 Wah-chah
 Mah-har
 Pah-vah-hā
 Wah-chah-kav-e-ah
 Wa-ha's-wah-chah
 Mah-ha'hr-kav-e-ah
 Wa-hās-mah-hah'r
 Wa-hā's-mah-hah'r-koi-po-koo
 Wa-hā's-mah-hah'r-koi-wěh-hā

grizzly bear
hoó-nahr
hoon-nah (subject)
hoon-rah (object)

black bear
pí-yah-hó-naht

Collected by Alexander Taylor (1860)
Numbers
 po-koo
 wa-hay 
 pa-hey 
 wat-sa 
 mahar 
 pawahe 
 wat-sa-kabiya 
 wa-hish-watchsa 
 mahar-cabearka 
 wa-hish-mar

Taylor claims "they do not count farther than ten"

Collected by Dr. Oscar Loew (1875)
Numbers
 pu-guʼ
 ve-heʼ
 paʼ-hi
 va-tchaʼ
 mahaʼr
 pa-vaʼhe
 vatchaʼ-kabyaʼ
 vehesh-vatchaʼ
 mahar-kabyaʼ
 vehes-mahar
 puku-hurura
 vehe-hurura

bear
unar

Collected by Charles Wilkes, USN (1838-1842)
Numbers
 pukū
 wehē
 pāhe
 watsā

bear
hundr

Other sources
desert fox: erow
Pacoima = from the root word Pako enter, meaning the entrance
Tujunga = from the root word old woman tux'uu Tujunga means Mountains of Health according to long-time residents.
Azusa = from the word -shuuk 'Ashuuksanga = his grandmother

Toponymy
The table below gives the names of various missions in the Tongva language.

See also
Cahuilla language
Chumashan languages

References

External links
 Native-languages.org: Gabrieliño (Tongva) Language
 Gabrielino language — overview at the Survey of California and Other Indian Languages.
 The Limu Project — active in Native California languages revitalization.
 2002 Tongva speech spoken at Cal Poly Pomona during the opening of a Tongva ethnobotanic garden; speech begins at 35:10.
 Keepers of Indigenous Ways: Tongva Language History & classes

Language
Indigenous languages of California
Takic
Takic languages
History of Los Angeles County, California
History of Orange County, California
History of San Bernardino County, California
History of the San Fernando Valley
Native American language revitalization